The LIU Sharks men's ice hockey team represents Long Island University in NCAA Division I ice hockey. The school announced their intention to begin a varsity schedule for the 2020–21 season on April 30, 2020. While starting out as an independent, the Sharks are a scheduling partner of Atlantic Hockey for at least their first season.

Currently, the Sharks are the only Division I program located in New York City, though all their home games will be played in Nassau County outside of the New York city limits.

History
After the college hockey season had been ended prematurely in March 2020, due to the COVID-19 pandemic, Long Island University announced their intention to found a men's Division I ice hockey team. The school had already established its women's team the year before and, despite the uncertainty for the upcoming season, LIU hired a coaching staff and recruited a full team of players.

Due to scheduling problems resulting from COVID-19, LIU entered into a scheduling partnership with Atlantic Hockey for its inaugural season. LIU would officially remain an independent program and would not be eligible for the conference tournament.

Season-by-season results

Coaches
Brett Riley was named as the team's first head coach on May 26, 2020.

As of the completion of 2021–22 season

Roster
As of July 8, 2022.

|}

Statistical leaders

Career points leaders

Career goaltending leaders

GP = Games played; Min = Minutes played; W = Wins; L = Losses; T = Ties; GA = Goals against; SO = Shutouts; SV% = Save percentage; GAA = Goals against average

minimum 1,000 minutes played

Statistics current through the start of the 2022-23 season.

See also
LIU Sharks women's ice hockey

References

External links

 
Ice hockey teams in New York (state)